Pritzker College Prep is a public four-year charter high school located in the Hermosa neighborhood in Chicago, Illinois. It is a part of the Noble Network of Charter Schools. It opened its doors in 2006 and serves over 986 students in grades nine through twelve, as of the 2017-2018 school year.

Background

History 
Pritzker College Prep was founded in 2006 as one of the first expansion campuses of the Noble Network of Charter Schools. It is named in honor of donors Penny Pritzker and Bryan Traubert.

Location 
Pritzker is located in the Hermosa neighborhood of Chicago in a building leased from the Archdiocese of Chicago. Before Pritzker opened, the building served as St. Philomena Elementary School.

Partnerships 
Since 2008, Pritzker has partnered with Phillips Exeter Academy for teacher training and collaboration around the Harkness method of instruction.

Each summer since 2012, rising seniors from the school attend the Pushkin Summer Institute at the University of Wisconsin-Madison for intensive Russian language studies. Since 2015, Pushkin participants have also been eligible to travel to Eastern Europe after graduation through a partner grant between PSI and the National Security Language Initiative for Youth.

Through Noble's partnership with the Right Angle Foundation and the Summer of a Lifetime program, top sophomores are invited to attend college summer programs around the country with most of their expenses covered.

Course Offerings

IB and AP Courses 
In June 2015 Pritzker became certified as an International Baccalaureate school. As of the 2018-2019 school year, the school also offers AP courses.

Band Program 
Pritzker's Jazz band performs annually at the Berklee College of Music, and has performed at Lake Forest College and the Chicago Jazz Festival, among other venues. In 2010, the program received new instruments thanks to a grant from Fidelity. Band teacher Ben Das was also named a TNTP Fishman Prize finalist in 2015.

Journalism Program 
The Journalism program, which produces The Pritzker Press online and in print, was established in 2014. Writers from the program compete annually through both the Scholastic Press Association of Chicago High School Media Awards and Conference and the Illinois Journalism Education Association's Newspaper & Digital News Media Competition. The Pritzker Press placed 3rd and 2nd overall in 2017 and 2018, respectively, in its division in the IJEA competition.

Extracurriculars

Athletics 
As of the 2018-2019 school year, the school has competitive teams for 15 sports: Football, boys’ soccer (varsity and JV), girls’ soccer (varsity and JC), boys’ rugby, girls’ rugby, girls’ volleyball, cross country (co-ed), boys’ basketball (varsity and JV), girls’ basketball (varsity and JV), cheerleading (co-ed), wrestling (co-ed), baseball, softball, track and field, and ultimate frisbee (co-ed).

Noble League (formerly Noble Athletic Conference) championships: 

 Football: 2009, 2010, 2012, 2014, 2015
 Cheer: 2014, 2015, 2016, 2017, 2018
 Girls’ Soccer: 2015, 2016, 2017, 2018
 Boys’ Soccer: 2010, 2011, 2012, 2014
 Baseball: 2009, 2015

IHSA Regional championships: 

 Girls’ Soccer: 2014, 2015, 2017
 Softball: 2014

State championships: 

 Boys’ Rugby: 2013 (IYRA TIER 3)
 Ultimate Frisbee: 2015 (IYU B-DIVISION)

Clubs 
As of the 2018-2019 school year, the school offers over 20 competitive and non-competitive clubs.

References

External links
Noble Network of Charter Schools
TheCharterSCALE: Pritzker College Prep

Educational institutions established in 2006
Noble Network of Charter Schools
Public high schools in Chicago
2006 establishments in Illinois